The Cabinet of Ukhnaagiin Khürelsükh, was established following the 2017 Mongolian presidential election, and the election by the Mongolian parliament of Ukhnaagiin Khürelsükh to the office of the Prime Minister of Mongolia on 4 October 2017.  The cabinet was submitted for approval on 13 October, and sworn in on 18 October

On June 24, 2020, Mongolian People's Party was re-elected to the parliament with a landslide victory.  Khurelsukh will continue to head the cabinet providing government stability and policy certainty.

On July 7, 2020, the Mongolian parliament approved Khürelsükh's cabinet structure of 14 ministries: six general and eight functional. The Ministry of Education, Culture, Science and Sports was split into Ministry of Education and Science and Ministry of Culture. The total ministers are 17: Prime Minister, Deputy Prime Minister, Cabinet Secretary, and the heads of the 14 ministries. Following the protests on January 20, U. Khurelsukh's government decided to resign at its own request, with 95 percent of the Mongolian parliament calling for his resignation. Parliamentary debates began on January 27 with the support of the President of Mongolia to elect L.Oyun-Erdene as the 32nd Prime Minister.

Cabinet officers 
Per listing on Mongolia Weekly, Montsame and Mongolian Focus
 Deputy Prime Minister: O Enkhtuvshin (2017–2020); Ya. Sodbaatar (2020–present) 
 Cabinet Secretary: Luvsannamsrain Oyun-Erdene (2017–present)
Ministry of Finance: Ch. Khurelbaatar (2017–present) 
Ministry of Justice and Internal Affairs: Ts Nyamdorj (2017–present); Kh. Nyambaatar (2020–present) 
Ministry of Defense: Nyamaagiin Enkhbold (2017–present); Gürsediin Saikhanbayar (2020–present)
Ministry of Construction and Urban Development: Kh Badelkhan (2017–2020); B. Munkhbaatar (2020–present) 
Ministry of Mining and Heavy Industry: D Sumiyabazar (2017–2020); G. Yondon (2020–present) 
Ministry of Education and Science: Lkhagvyn Tsedevsuren (2020–present) 
Ministry of Environment and Tourism: N Tserenbat (2017–2020); Davaajantsangiin Sarangerel (2020–present) 
Ministry of Culture: S. Chuluun (2020–present) 
Ministry of Foreign Affairs: D Tsogtbaatar (2017–2020); N. Enkhtaivan (2020–present) 
Ministry of Road and Transport Development: J Bat-Erdene (2017–2018); Ya Sodbaatar (2018–2019); B Enkhamgalan (2019–2020); L. Khaltar (2020–present) 
Ministry of Energy: Ts Davaasuren (2017–2020); N. Tavinbekh (2020–present) 
Ministry of Food, Agriculture and Light Industry:   S Batzorig (2017–2019); Ch Ulaan (2019–2020); Z. Mendsaikhan (2020–present) 
Ministry of Health: D. Sarangerel (2017–2020); T. Munkhsaikhan (2020–present) 
Ministry of Labor and Social Protection: S Chinzorig (2017–2020); A. Ariunzaya (2020–present)

Former ministries 
 Ministry of Culture, Education, and Sports (before 2020): Ts Tsogzolma (2017–2019); Yo Baatarbileg (2019–2020);

References

Cabinets established in 2017
Cabinets established in 2020
Government of Mongolia
Cabinets disestablished in 2021